The Police Superintendents’ Association is the sole representative body for police officers in the ranks of superintendent and chief superintendent in England and Wales. Its members are the senior operational leaders in policing in the 43 Home Office forces, British Transport Police, Civil Nuclear Constabulary, Isle of Man Constabulary, the Bermuda Police Service, Royal Gibraltar Police and the Gibraltar Defence Police. The association's headquarters are in Pangbourne, Berkshire.

National Officers

The Association has three full-time national officers. Its president is Chief Superintendent Paul Fotheringham. Chief Superintendent Dan Murphy is the national secretary (appointed 2017). Under association rules, the president holds office for up to three years.

History

The 1919 Police Act created a Police Federation of England and Wales to represent officers below the rank of superintendent, but no formal provision was made for superintendents. In 1920 the Home Office called a conference of superintendents, one from each force, or two from those with more than twelve superintendents, to decide how they should be represented on the Police Council. The delegates decided to elect one county and one city or borough superintendent to the Police Council and a committee of eight was formed to communicate with the Home Secretary. This was the beginning of the present Superintendents’ Association.

The Police Council met for the first time on 6 July 1920 and formulated Police Regulations to provide national conditions of service, discipline and allowances for officers. The following year, the Home Secretary approved the establishment of four permanent District conferences for superintendents, with each force sending one representative, or two from larger forces. They were permitted to convene twice every year, at public expense.

In 1952, a committee chaired by Lord Oaksey published a report that contained recommendations on police pay and conditions of service. This led to the formation of the Police Superintendents’ Association of England and Wales and also included the Metropolitan Police Service in London and the City of London Police, both of which had been outside the previous arrangements

The association is the sole representative body for superintendents and chief superintendents and has represented its members through a series of reforms including most notably the Willink Commission (1960), the Edmund-Davies Inquiry (1977), the Sheehy Inquiry (1992), the Winsor Review (2010) and the Hutton pension reforms (2010).

As the association grew in strength and influence over the years, the Home Office agreed to fund a Chief Superintendent to be seconded from a force as the full-time Secretary of the association. Additional funding was granted in 1983, 1995 and 2004 respectively for the posts of National President, National Deputy Secretary and vice president. In 2014 the post of Deputy National Secretary was removed and replaced by an employed police staff member as Assistant Secretary.

In 2018, the association shortened its name to become the Police Superintendents' Association (dropping 'of England and Wales') to more accurately reflect the UK-wide scope of its membership. On 23 May 2018, the Association became a private limited company. In 2020, current Home Secretary, Priti Patel MP formally opened the refurbished head offices of the association in Pangbourne, Berkshire.

In May 2020, the association celebrated 100 years since the election of the first leader of the superintendents -  Chief Superintendent Charles Dawson (Liverpool City Police) who was elected on 27 May 1920.

In July 2020, together with the Home Secretary and Policing Minister, the PSA held an online centenary celebration of the formation of the Police Council. The centenary was held on line due to health regulations during the pandemic

On 23 August 2021, former presidents and secretaries met at Pangbourne to celebrate the life of Superintendent Gerry Richardson GC who was killed in the execution of his duty 50 years earlier.

Membership

Serving police officers who are Superintendents or Chief Superintendents in one of the 43 Home Office England and Wales police forces, the British Transport Police, the Civil Nuclear Constabulary, Isle of Man Constabulary, Bermuda Police, Royal Gibraltar Police and Gibraltar Defence Police can join the association. Since 2014, this has included the new Direct Entry Superintendents recruited directly into the rank from outside the police service. The association has around 1300 members. Eligible officers are not automatically enrolled and must opt-in to join, paying an annual subscription.

Structure

There are currently 49 Branches of the association, one for each of the 49 eligible forces. The Branches are grouped together into five Districts, A, B, C, D and E. These represent largely geographic areas but are configured to ensure a mixture of large metropolitan forces and smaller forces within each District. Branch officials, elected by their peers, are the voting members who attend District meetings. The number of delegates who attend from each Branch is in proportion to the number of members within the Branch. District meetings are held three times a year, hosted by different Branches in turn on a rota basis. National Officers attend each District meeting.

The president chairs the association's national executive committee, which is its policy-making body. The NEC includes the vice president and two representatives from each District.  There are also representatives for women members, black, Asian and minority ethnic (BME) members, lesbian, gay, bisexual and transgender (LGBT) members and disabled members.  These ‘reserved places’ are elected and are there to ensure that the NEC represents and champions the diverse interests of Superintendents and the wider service. The Association also has a representative from Wales to represent Welsh police interests. The NEC meets five times per year and the association holds an annual AGM, usually in spring.  It also holds a national conference every September

Presidents

Presidents were elected in March each year prior to 1993.  After 1993 Presidents were elected in March every three years.

 2022-  C/Supt Paul Fotheringham, Kent
 2019 - 2022           C/Supt Paul Griffiths OBE, OStJ,    Gwent
 2016-2019     C/Supt Gavin Thomas OBE,       Gloucestershire 
 2013-2016	C/Supt Irene Curtis OBE,	Lancashire 
 2010-2013	C/Supt Derek Barnett OBE,	Cheshire 
 2007-2010	C/Supt Ian Johnston QPM,	Gwent 
 2004-2007	C/Supt Rick Naylor QPM,	South Yorkshire 
 2001-2004	C/Supt Kevin Morris QPM,	Surrey 
 1998-2001	C/Supt Peter Gammon MBE,	Kent 
 1995-1998	C/Supt Brian Mackenzie OBE,	Durham 
 1993-1995	Chief Supt David Golding MBE,	Metropolitan 
 1992-1993	Chief Supt Eddie Day, Hampshire 
 1991-1992	Chief Supt David Golding MBE,	Metropolitan 
 1990-1991	Supt David P. Roberts,	Avon & Somerset 
 1989-1990	Chief Supt Trevor B. Davey,	West Yorkshire 
 1988-1989	Chief Supt Don Grieve QPM,	Merseyside 
 1987-1988	Chief Supt Michael Dixon,	Norfolk 
 1986-1987	Chief Supt Leslie Stowe,	Metropolitan 
 1985-1986	Supt Tony Parkes MBE,	Devon & Cornwall 
 1984-1985	Chief Supt K. Stuart Anderson,	South Yorkshire 
 1983-1984	Chief Supt John Wigham,	Lancashire 
 1982-1983	Chief Supt Harold Swatridge,	Dorset 
 1981-1982	Chief Supt Douglas Taylor,	West Yorkshire 
 1980-1981	Chief Supt Michael Bricknell,	Thames Valley 
 1979-1980	Chief Supt Ken Rivers,	Metropolitan 
 1978-1979	Chief Supt J. Wilkinson,	South Yorkshire
 1977-1978	Chief Supt Peter Hawkins,	Avon & Somerset 
 1976-1977	Chief Supt Valentine Shortridge,	Gwent 
 1975-1976	Chief Supt Robert Taylor,	Metropolitan 
 1974-1975	Chief Supt H.M. Shelley,	Derbyshire 
 1973-1974	Chief Supt W. John Hawkins,	Gloucestershire 
 1972-1973	Supt Joan Parker QPM,	Durham 
 1971-1972	Chief Supt L. Barker,	Metropolitan 
 1970-1971	Chief Supt R.E. Coombs MBE,	Hampshire 
 1969-1970	Chief Supt F.D. Slack,	Norfolk 
 1968-1969	Chief Supt G.J. Kelland,	Metropolitan 
 1967-1968	Chief Supt Wilkes,	Cheshire

Crest

In 2002 the association's 50th anniversary was marked with a new heraldic coat of arms. This was presented on behalf of Her Majesty at the association's national conference by the Lord Lieutenant for Cheshire Mr William Bromley Davenport.

See also 
 Police unions

References

External links 
 

Professional associations based in the United Kingdom
Law enforcement in England and Wales
Law enforcement-related professional associations
Police unions